Orzeł or Orzel may refer to:

Places
Orzeł, Greater Poland Voivodeship, a village in west-central Poland
Orzeł, Masovian Voivodeship, a village in east-central Poland

People
 Chad Orzel, an American science writer
 Conrad Orzel (born 2000), a Canadian figure skater
 Kazimierz Orzeł (born 1943), a Polish long-distance runner
 Sławomir Orzeł (born 1979), a Polish bodybuilder
 Stanley J. Orzel, an American film director

Other
Orzeł incident, a diplomatic incident at the beginning of World War II
ORP Orzeł (disambiguation), the name of three submarines of the Polish Navy
Orzeł-class submarine
The Eagle (1959 film), a Polish film
Orzeł Kolno, a Polish football club

See also
 

Polish-language surnames
Surnames from nicknames